The index of physics articles is split into multiple pages due to its size.

To navigate by individual letter use the table of contents below.

Q

Q-Spoil
Q-ball
Q-switching
QCD matter
QCD string
QCD sum rules
QCD vacuum
QED: The Strange Theory of Light and Matter
QED vacuum
QMAP
QMC@Home
QMR effect
QSO J0005-0006
QSO J0303-0019
QSO J0842+1835
Q band
Q factor
Q star
Q value (nuclear science)
Qian Sanqiang
Qiwam al-Din Muhammad al-Hasani
Quadratic configuration interaction
Quadrupole
Quadrupole ion trap
Quadrupole magnet
Quadrupole mass analyzer
Quaestiones quaedam philosophicae
Quake-Catcher Network
QuakeFinder
QuakeSat
Quality Assurance Review Center
Quan-Sheng Shu
Quantization (physics)
Quantization error
Quantization of the electromagnetic field
Quantum
Quantum-confined Stark effect
Quantum-mechanical explanation of intermolecular interactions
Quantum (book)
Quantum 1/f noise
Quantum Aspects of Life
Quantum Bayesianism
Quantum Darwinism
Quantum Electronics (journal)
Quantum Hall effect
Quantum KZ equations
Quantum LC circuit
Quantum Monte Carlo
Quantum Philosophy
Quantum Tunnelling Composite
Quantum Zeno effect
Quantum acoustics
Quantum algorithm
Quantum beats
Quantum biology
Quantum bus
Quantum capacitance
Quantum cascade laser
Quantum channel
Quantum chaos
Quantum chromodynamics
Quantum cloning
Quantum coherence
Quantum cohomology
Quantum computer
Quantum concentration
Quantum correlation
Quantum cosmology
Quantum critical point
Quantum decoherence
Quantum defect
Quantum degeneracy
Quantum dimer models
Quantum dissipation
Quantum dot
Quantum dot cellular automaton
Quantum dot laser
Quantum efficiency
Quantum efficiency of a solar cell
Quantum electrodynamics
Quantum electromagnetic resonator
Quantum electronics
Quantum electronics (journal)
Quantum energy teleportation
Quantum entanglement
Quantum eraser experiment
Quantum field theory
Quantum field theory in curved spacetime
Quantum flavordynamics
Quantum fluctuation
Quantum fluid
Quantum flux parametron
Quantum foam
Quantum gauge theory
Quantum geometry
Quantum gravity
Quantum gravity epoch
Quantum gyroscope
Quantum harmonic oscillator
Quantum heterostructure
Quantum history
Quantum hydrodynamics
Quantum hypothesis
Quantum indeterminacy
Quantum information
Quantum inverse scattering method
Quantum key distribution
Quantum key distribution network
Quantum level
Quantum limit
Quantum logic
Quantum machine
Quantum magnetism
Quantum mechanical Bell test prediction
Quantum mechanics
Quantum mechanics of time travel
Quantum metamaterials
Quantum metrology
Quantum mirage
Quantum mutual information
Quantum noise
Quantum non-equilibrium
Quantum nondemolition measurement
Quantum nonlocality
Quantum number
Quantum operation
Quantum optics
Quantum oscillations
Quantum paraelectricity
Quantum phase transition
Quantum phases
Quantum point contact
Quantum probability
Quantum processing unit
Quantum pseudo-telepathy
Quantum realm
Quantum register
Quantum relative entropy
Quantum rotor model
Quantum size effects
Quantum solid
Quantum solvent
Quantum spin model
Quantum state
Quantum statistical mechanics
Quantum suicide and immortality
Quantum superposition
Quantum technology
Quantum teleportation
Quantum thermodynamics
Quantum tomography
Quantum triviality
Quantum tunnelling
Quantum tunnelling composite
Quantum turbulence
Quantum vortex
Quantum walk
Quantum well
Quantum well infrared photodetector
Quantum well laser
Quantum wire
Quantum yield
Quark
Quark-nova
Quark (disambiguation)
Quark epoch
Quark model
Quark number
Quark star
Quarkonium
Quark–gluon plasma
Quark–lepton complementarity
Quarterly Journal of the RAS
Quarterly Journal of the Royal Astronomical Society
Quartic interaction
Quartz crystal microbalance
Quasar
Quasi-invariant measure
Quasi-periodic oscillation
Quasi-phase-matching
Quasi-satellite
Quasi-solid
Quasi-star
Quasi-steady state cosmology
Quasi Fermi level
Quasiatom
Quasicrystal
Quasinormal mode
Quasiparticle
Quasiperiodic motion
Quasiprobability distribution
Quasistability
Quasistatic approximation
Quasistatic equilibrium
Quasistatic loading
Quasistatic process
Qubit
Qubit field theory
Quenched approximation
Quenching (fluorescence)
Quintessence (physics)
Quirino Majorana
Quiver diagram

Indexes of physics articles